Enrique Jorge Morea (11 April 1924 – 15 March 2017) was an Argentine tennis player.

Morea reached the singles semifinals of the French Championships in 1953, beating Mervyn Rose and Gardnar Mulloy and then losing to Ken Rosewall. At the French in 1954, he beat Jozsef Asboth and Mulloy, then lost to Art Larsen in the semifinals.

Morea won the mixed-doubles title of the 1950 French Championships. He also won two gold medals at the inaugural men's tennis competition at the 1951 Pan American Games. Lance Tingay of The Daily Telegraph ranked Morea as world No. 10 in 1953 and 1954. As of 2014, Morea was the honorary president of the Asociación Argentina de Tenis (AAT).

Grand Slam finals

Mixed doubles: 4 (1 title, 3 runners-up)

References

External links
 
 
 

1924 births
2017 deaths
Argentine male tennis players
French Championships (tennis) champions
Tennis players from Buenos Aires
Tennis players at the 1951 Pan American Games
Tennis players at the 1955 Pan American Games
Grand Slam (tennis) champions in mixed doubles
Pan American Games gold medalists for Argentina
Pan American Games silver medalists for Argentina
Pan American Games medalists in tennis
Medalists at the 1951 Pan American Games
Medalists at the 1955 Pan American Games